Mesuli Kama is a South African politician who serves as a Member of the Western Cape Provincial Parliament for the African National Congress. He was elected to the provincial parliament in May 2019. Kama is the ANC's spokesperson on community safety.

References

External links

Living people
Year of birth missing (living people)
Xhosa people
People from Cape Town
African National Congress politicians
Members of the Western Cape Provincial Parliament